James C. Sly (August 8, 1807 – August 31, 1864) was a Mormon pioneer, member of the Mormon Battalion in the Mexican–American War, scout for early west trails used during the California gold rush, journal keeper in 1848 and 1849, early US western settler of several communities, and Mormon missionary to Canada.

Service in the Mormon Battalion
In 1848, several men who had served in the Mormon Battalion were still working in California, waiting to proceed to the Valley of the Great Salt Lake as soon as a pass should open. According to a previous arrangement a company of eight people started May 1, 1848, Sgt. David Brewett being elected Captain, to pioneer, if possible, a wagon road of the Sierra, Nevada mountains eastward. At that time the Truckee route was still impassable.

This company consisted of David Brewett, Captain Ira J. Willis, James C. Sly, Israel Evens, Jacob G. Truman, Esra Allen, J. R. Allred, Henderson Cox and Robert Pixton.

Three days' travel brought the group to Iron Hill where the deep snow made further travel impossible. One man's donkey was completely buried in the snow except his ears.  The group climbed to the top of the mountain, where they could see only snow-capped mountains ahead. They decided to postpone the enterprise until later in the season. So far as they could judge, a wagon road would at least be possible and perhaps a success. One day's travel took them back from snow to a warm spring atmosphere where flowers bloomed and vegetation was far advanced.

On May 1, 1848, several men from the battalion, and others from Sacramento Valley subscribed $512.00 and bought two brass cannons from Captain John A. Sutter, to be taken to Great Salt Lake for the benefit of the Church of Jesus Christ of Latter-day Saints (LDS Church).

The group departed for the Great Basin on July 2, 1848. The historical record states:
By July 2 the company was again on the march. Two days' travel from Pleasant Valley, that is about fifty miles east of Sutter's Fort, brought them to Sly's Park, a small valley or mountain dell, thus named for Captain JAMES C. SLY, who first discovered it. … Four days' travel over rough and rugged mountains took them across the summit, and they found themselves safely landed at the head of Carson Valley, Nevada.

Later life
Sly married Susannah Gustin on March 25, 1849 in Great Salt Lake City. He was wounded outside Fort Levan early in the Utah Black Hawk War. He died in 1864 in Chicken Creek, Juab, Utah. He was buried in Chicken Creek, Juab County, Utah.

Notes

References
  James C. Sly Diary; SLC Archives and old church records 
 Thomas Gustin bible. J.C.S. buried in Chicken Creek, but town is gone and the area is covered in farms. Grave unknown... Nephi, Utah records  
 James C. Sly married Mary Bassett March 25, 1829, Manchester, NY. They had a son, Neamiah, born November 19, 1829, died August 25, 1830. Mary died July 25, 1830.
 James C. Sly married Margriet Jane Fuller September 1, 1831.
 James was in Mormon Battalion and named SLY PARK in California; and was there where gold was discovered and help found Mormon Trail over the Sierra Mountains. See History by Lenore Sly Waite, Salt Lake Archives.

External links

   Traveling the Mormon Emigrant Trail (They named this encampment after James C. Sly)
  James Calvin Sly Museum (In the Sly Park Recreation Area) Pollock Pines, California
  Sly's Park, a small valley, named for Captain James C. Sly
  Led first wagons on Salt Lake cutoff, which became the Gold Rush Trail
  Mormon Battalion Company B Roster
   Timeline of the life of James C. Sly
   Black Hawk Indian War of Utah
  The Pollock Pines Epic
   - scanned journal pages

Sly Park
   Sly Park Recreation Area
  Sly Park History
  The Pollock Pines Epic

1807 births
1864 deaths
19th-century Mormon missionaries
Latter Day Saints from Utah
American Mormon missionaries in Canada
Members of the Mormon Battalion
Mormon pioneers
People from Wayne County, New York
People of the California Gold Rush
Latter Day Saints from California